This is a list of museums in Peru.

In Arequipa region
 Andean Sanctuaries Museum

In Cusco region
 Museo de Arte Precolombino, Cusco
 Museum of Sacred, Magical and Medicinal PlantsThere is a great deal to be done
 Real Felipe Fortress - currently the Peruvian Army Museum)

In Lambayeque region
 Brüning Museum
 Royal Tombs of Sipán Museum
 Sicán National Museum

In Ica Region
 Regional Museum of Ica "Adolfo Bermúdez Jenkins"

In Lima region
 Lima Art Museum
 Larco Museum 
 Gold Museum of Peru and Arms of the World
 Museo de la Nación
 Museo Mario Testino
 Museo Nacional de Arqueología, Antropología e Historia del Perú
 Museum of Italian Art
 Museum of Contemporary Art, Lima
 National Afro-Peruvian Museum
 National Museum of Peru

In San Martin region
 Regional Museum of the National University of San Martin

In Tacna region
 Alto de la Alianza Museum - in the Alto de la Alianza site
 Tacna Courthouse - (contains the Reincorporation Museum, the Tacna Art Gallery, and the Historic Departmental Archives.)
 National Railway Museum (Peru)
 Salon Museo Arqueologico - archeological museum

References

See also 
 List of museums by country

Peru
 
Museums
Peru
Museums